Ömer Onan (born February 4, 1978) is a Turkish former professional basketball player. Standing 1.94 m (6 ft 4 ½ in) and weighing 95.4 kg (210 lbs.), he played at the shooting guard position.

Playing career

Pro clubs
During his professional playing career, Onan won the European-wide third-tier level league, the FIBA Korać Cup championship in 1996. Domestically in his native Turkey, he also won the Turkish Super League championship 11 times (1996, 1997, 2002, 2003, 2004, 2006, 2007, 2008, 2010, 2011, and 2014). In addition to that, he won the Turkish Cup title 8 times (1996, 1997, 1998, 2001, 2002, 2010, 2011, and 2013); and the Turkish Super Cup title 5 times (1996, 1998, 2000, 2006, 2013).

His number 7 jersey was retired by Fenerbahçe in 2014.

Turkish national team
Onan was a member of the senior men's Turkish national team. He was a part of the Turkish teams that won the silver medal at the EuroBasket 2001 and the 2010 FIBA World Championship.

Post-playing career
In August 2014, Onan retired from playing professional basketball, and became a team manager of his longtime playing club, Fenerbahçe, replacing Mirsad Türkcan at that position.

References

External links

 Ömer Onan at fenerbahce.org
 Ömer Onan at euroleague.net
 Ömer Onan at tblstat.net

1978 births
Living people
Anadolu Efes S.K. players
Fenerbahçe men's basketball players
Shooting guards
Small forwards
Sportspeople from Mersin
Turkish basketball coaches
Turkish men's basketball players
Ülker G.S.K. basketball players
2010 FIBA World Championship players
2002 FIBA World Championship players